Olgunlar can refer to:

 Olgunlar, Adıyaman
 Olgunlar, Refahiye